The Parable of the Great Banquet or the Wedding Feast or the Marriage of the King's Son is a parable told by Jesus in the New Testament, found in  and .

It is not to be confused with a different Parable of the Wedding Feast recorded in Luke's Gospel.

Narrative
The version of the parable in the Gospel of Matthew is as follows:

The version of in the Gospel of Luke is somewhat shorter, and refers only to a banquet rather than a wedding feast:

The non-canonical Gospel of Thomas also includes the parable as saying 64; its version is quite close to Luke's, although ends slightly differently with a conclusion that "Buyers and traders [will] not enter the places of my father."

Interpretation
The classical interpretation of Matthew's version of the parable is that the king is God; the king's son is Jesus himself; the original invited guests are the Jews; the king's servants who are attacked are God's prophets; and the new guests are the Gentiles and other "unworthy".  The eschatological image of a wedding used by Matthew also occurs in the parable of the Faithful Servant and the parable of the Ten Virgins. The original invitation to the Jews is extended to also include Gentiles. In Luke, the invitation is extended particularly to the "poor, the crippled, the blind and the lame", evidencing explicit concern for the "poor and the outcasts."

In early Christianity, the parable may have been taken more openly as a direct reference to Jews who did not convert to Christianity; in particular, the reference in Matthew to the king sending his armies, destroying the murderers, and burning their city seems to be a reference to the destruction of Jerusalem in AD 70 by Roman armies.  Later Christian interpretations have adjusted the original guests more generally to be the already religious who have no time for God, including Christians: they are people who accepted an invitation, but when the food is ready, claim they are too busy to turn up.

Matthew's version additionally suggests that even some of the newly invited guests are not worthy of sitting at the table, if they are not wearing a proper wedding garment.  What exactly the wedding garment symbolizes is not generally agreed on among Christian theologians.  Some commentators  suggest that the wedding clothes or garment in this parable were provided by the host, but this is unlikely to be the intended implication. Augustine of Hippo interpreted the garment as symbolizing charity, an interpretation not widely accepted even in medieval times.  Martin Luther suggested that the garment represented Christ himself.  John Calvin felt these controversies in interpreting the meaning of the "wedding garment" were overblown:
 As to the wedding garment, is it faith, or is it a holy life? This is a useless controversy; for faith cannot be separated from good works, nor do good works proceed from any other source than from faith. Christ intended only to state that the Lord calls us on the express condition of our being renewed by the Spirit ... and that, in order to our remaining permanently in his house, we must put off the old man with his pollutions ... and lead a new life.

Other commentators focus on the role of clothing (or, in this case, the lack of appropriate clothing) in the New Testament (see Biblical clothing). Bernard Brandon Scott notes that the parable immediately follows the parable of the Wicked Husbandmen in Matthew, and that the harsh treatment of the man without wedding clothes is related to the harsh treatment of the bad tenants in that parable: people hired or invited by the king (God) who do not perform their duties.

In the Gospel of Thomas, the parable "becomes an exhortation against the affairs of business and a life of gain," reflecting Gnosticism's prizing of ascetic lifestyles.

Historicity
The parable appears in three major works, suggesting it was possibly in the Q source, a hypothetical theorized document or source of sayings of Jesus from the oral tradition of early Christians that later gospel writers drew on.  Matthew's version and the version in Luke and Thomas do not entirely line up; textual critics generally suspect it is more likely that it is Matthew's version that drifted from the original, as parts of it seem to be an explanation of the destruction of Jerusalem as divine punishment too closely.  Matthew's version makes more sense for a church that has many more Gentiles in it than the one at the time of Jesus's death and additionally has knowledge of the outcome of the First Jewish–Roman War.

Art and hymnody

The parable has been depicted by artists such as Bernardo Cavallino, Jan Luyken, and John Everett Millais.

A number of Christian hymns have been inspired by the parable, such as "All is ready" by Fanny Crosby, and "All Things are Ready" by Charles H. Gabriel, which begins:

"All things are ready," come to the feast!
Come, for the table now is spread;
Ye famishing, ye weary, come,
And thou shalt be richly fed.

Music
The topic was the prescribed reading for the Second Sunday after Trinity and Twentieth Sunday after Trinity. For the first occasion Bach composed cantatas Die Himmel erzählen die Ehre Gottes, BWV 76 in 1723 and Ach Gott, vom Himmel sieh darein, BWV 2 in 1724. For the second occasion he wrote Schmücke dich, o liebe Seele, BWV 180 in 1724.

See also
 Life of Jesus in the New Testament
 Luke 14
 Matthew 22
 Ministry of Jesus
 Parable of the Faithful Servant
 Parable of the Ten Virgins
 Parable of the Wedding Feast

References

Banquet, Parable of the Great
Metaphors referring to food and drink